Luis Ernesto Franco (born December 21, 1983) is a Mexican actor, writer, producer and model. He is known for playing the titular role in seasons three and four of the serie Señora Acero.

Filmography

Film

Television

Awards And Nominations

References

External links
 

Living people
Male actors from Nayarit
People from Tepic
Mexican male film actors
Mexican male telenovela actors
People educated at Centro de Estudios y Formación Actoral
1983 births